Dizdarlije  is a village in the municipality of Kozarska Dubica, Republika Srpska, Bosnia and Herzegovina.

References

Populated places in Dubica, Bosnia and Herzegovina